The 1973 Swiss League Cup was the second Swiss League Cup competition. It was played in summer 1973 as a pre-season tournament to the 1973–74 Swiss football season. It was won by Grasshopper Club Zürich who defeated FC Winterthur 5–4 on penalties after a 2–2 draw in the final.

Round 1

|}

Quarter-finals

|}

Semi-finals

|}

Final
The final took place on 10 October 1973 at Letzigrund in Zürich.

|}

References
 Swiss League Cup results

1973
League Cup